MarQus Johnson is an American basketball coach who was the former head coach of St. Augustine's Falcons of which was categorized under the bracket NCAA D-II.

Coaching career 
On March 3, 2022, it was reported that he would part ways with his team, St. Augustine's Falcons, effective immediately. The school now would probe for their next potential head coach.

Head Coaching Record 
As of March 3, 2022

|-
| align="left" |St. Augustine's Falcons
| align="left" |2015-16
|27||11||16||.4074 || align="center"| 
|-
| align="left" |St. Augustine's Falcons
| align="left" |2016-17
|29||13||16||.4483 || align="center"| 
|-
| align="left" |St. Augustine's Falcons
| align="left" |2017-18
|29||14||15||.4828 || align="center"| 
|-
| align="left" |St. Augustine's Falcons
| align="left" |2018-19
|28||11||17||.3929 || align="center"| 
|-
| align="left" |St. Augustine's Falcons
| align="left" |2019-20
|30||12||18||.4000 || align="center"| 
|-
| align="left" |St. Augustine's Falcons
| align="left" |2021-22
|26||6||20||.2308 || align="center"| 
|-class="sortbottom"
| align="center" colspan=2|Career||179|||67|||112||.3743||

References

External links
MarQus Johnson coaching profile at St. Augustine's University

Living people

Year of birth missing (living people)
American men's basketball coaches
Basketball coaches from North Carolina